Agathe Turgis (19 January 1892 – 20 August 1980) was a French fencer. She competed in the women's individual foil event at the 1936 Summer Olympics.

References

External links
 

1892 births
1980 deaths
French female foil fencers
Olympic fencers of France
Fencers at the 1936 Summer Olympics